The Soushen Ji, variously translated as In Search of the Sacred, In Search of the Supernatural, and Anecdotes about Spirits and Immortals, is a Chinese compilation of legends, short stories, and hearsay concerning Chinese gods, Chinese ghosts, and other supernatural phenomena. Although the authorship of the book is not made explicit in the text, it is believed to have been written and compiled by Gan Bao, a historian at the court of Emperor Yuan of Jin (sometimes wrongly referred to as Yü Pao) around AD350. It was reissued in numerous editions, including in 1593. The book usually consists of 464 stories.

Stories
Notable stories include:

 Gan Jiang Mo Xie〈干將莫邪〉
 Wu Wang Xiao Nü〈吳王小女〉
 Li Ji Zhan She〈李寄斬蛇〉a legend about serpent-slaying: Li Ji Slays the Giant Serpent (Li Chi Slays the Serpent), similar to the legend of Chen Jinggu.
 Han Bing Fufu〈韓憑夫婦〉

The collection also contains a variant of the story of a Swan Maiden (or Heavenly/Celestial Bride) who marries a mortal man.

Legacy
Pu Songling cites Gan Bao's work as a far greater work than his own, the now famous Strange Stories from a Chinese Studio.

References

 Gan Bao. In Search of the Supernatural: The Written Record, translated into English by Kenneth J. DeWoskin and James Irving Crump. Stanford University Press, 1996.

Further reading

External links 
 搜神記 (Sou Shen Ji) at Project Gutenberg (in Chinese)
 

Chinese literature
4th-century documents
4th-century books
Jin dynasty (266–420)
Chinese mythology
Chinese folklore